The 2011 FIBA Europe Under-20 Championship was the 14th edition of the FIBA Europe Under-20 Championship. The competition featured 16 teams, held in Bilbao, Basque Country, Spain from July 14–24. Spain became a champion for the first time.

Participating teams
  (Winners, 2010 FIBA Europe Under-20 Championship Division B)

  (Runners-up, 2010 FIBA Europe Under-20 Championship Division B)

Group stages

Preliminary round
In this round, the sixteen teams are allocated in four groups of four teams each. The top three will advance to the Qualifying Round. The last team of each group will play for the 13th–16th place in the Classification Games.

Times given below are in CEST (UTC+2).

Group A

Group B

Group C

Group D

Qualifying round
The twelve teams remaining will be allocated in two groups of six teams each. The four top teams advance to the quarterfinals. The last two teams of each group play for the 9th–12th place.

Group E

Group F

Classification round
The last teams of each group in the Preliminary Round will compete in this Classification Round. The four teams will play in one group. The last two teams will be relegated to Division B for the next season.

Group G

Knockout round

Championship

Quarterfinals

Semifinals

Bronze-medal game

Final

5th–8th playoffs

Semifinals

7th-place game

5th-place game

9th–12th playoffs

Semifinals

11th-place game

9th-place game

Final standings

Awards

All-Tournament Team
  Nikola Mirotić (MVP)
  Furkan Aldemir 
  Alessandro Gentile 
  Bojan Dubljević 
  Evan Fournier

External links
Official Site

FIBA U20 European Championship
2011–12 in European basketball
2011–12 in Spanish basketball
International youth basketball competitions hosted by Spain